A word may refer to:

 A (word), the article "a" in the English language
 The A Word, a BBC drama television series about autism
 AWord, a RISC OS filetype for Acorn Advance Wordprocessor
 Any of several controversial or offensive words that begin with the letter "a". Usually rendered "the A-word". Particularly:
 Asshole 
 Adultery

See also
 A (disambiguation)
 Ascent of the A-Word